Titan Antakshari – Intercollegiate Championship is an Indian musical game show that aired on Zee TV every Friday. The show is a replacement of the Titan Antakshari -L'il Champs.

Concept 
Antakshari...Inter college special is hosted by Karan Oberoi and Himani Kapoor. The show is featuring the best and intelligent students of several colleges of India, who will form the three teams: DEEWANE, PARWANE and MASTANE.  The contestants of these three teams will criticize each other's teams, and create moments of fun n hungama. Three rounds followed by "Grand Finale". The season-2 finale teams were from Kanpur, Kolkata and Ahemdabad in which Yami & Yashi won.

Winners
Intercollegiate Championship
Yami Kulshrestha (2007)
Yashi Kulshrestha (2007)

Cast 
Sansui Antakshari

 Annu Kapoor- Host (1994–2006)
 Rajeshwari Sachdev- Co-host (1994–2001)
 Pallavi Joshi- Co-host (2001–2005)

Titan Antakshari

 Sunil Pal- Host (season 1)
 Himani Kapoor- Host
 Karan Oberoi- Host (season 2)

Antakshari – Intercollegiate Championship

 Karan Oberoi – Host
 Himani Kapoor – Host

Zee TV original programming
Singing talent shows
Indian game shows
2007 Indian television series debuts